Vinod Sridhar Tawde (Marathi pronunciation: [ʋinoːd̪ t̪aːʋɖeː]; born 20 July 1963) is an Indian politician from Maharashtra and a senior leader of the Bharatiya Janata Party (BJP). He was the General Secretary for Maharashtra unit of the party, President for Mumbai, All India National Executive Council Member and a key member of co-ordination Committee of the BJP for the 12th and 13th Lok Sabha Election

Vinod Tawde  was the minister for School Education, Higher and technical education, Sports and Youth welfare, Minority development as well as Marathi Bhasha (Language) and culture; this is his third consecutive term as the Member of the Legislative Council of Maharashtra. Earlier, he was the Leader of Opposition in the Maharashtra Legislative Council.

Early life and education
Vinod Tawde was born on 20 July 1964 in a Maratha family in the Girangaon area of Bombay (present-day Mumbai).

Vinod Tawde is a Higher Secondary School Certificate holder from Sathaye College (previously known as 'Parle College'). After passing the Higher Secondary School Certificate examination, Tawde pursued a vocational course from Dnyaneshwar Vidyapeeth, Pune which is an Educational Trust that provides technical training courses.

Political career
In 1995, Vinod Tawde was first named as the Maharashtra General Secretary of the BJP and he served up to 1999. Once again in 2002, he was assigned the responsibility; he served the term up to 2011. In 1999, Vinod Tawde was elected as the President of the Mumbai Metropolitan Unit of the BJP. He enjoys the record of being the youngest candidate elected for this position. Vinod Tawde is on the board of directors of Rambhau Mhalgi Prabodhini, a non-profit organisation that provides leadership training to socio-political activists.

In Maharashtra assembly election - 2014
Vinod Tawde elected as Member of Legislative assembly of Maharashtra from Borivali assembly constituency. He was sworn in as a minister of school education and sports, higher and technical education, medical education, Marathi Bhasha and cultural affairs at an extravagant ceremony at the Wankhede Stadium in Mumbai on 31 October 2014.

Initiatives taken

2011 
Vinod Tawde consistently supported mill workers who raised their housing concerns; he assured them a fair and just resolution.  Vinod Tawde resolved the issue of overdue insurance premium of 45,000 in the police department.

2012 
Vinod Tawde demanded an early completion of memorial of Shivaji in the Arabian Sea which was long pending and was first proposed in 1980. He demanded a tweak in law to bring Shivaji Park out of the silence zone stating that the park has a rich political history and prohibiting public rallies out there was not a good precedent. Between 1999 and 2003, there took a preferential allotment of over 20 hectares of MHADA land spread over 67 plots in Mumbai at throwaway prices to politicians or their trusts by a state sub-committee comprising a handful of Congress and NCP ministers. In 2012, Vinod Tawde asked the chief minister, Prithviraj Chavan to take back those plots where there was nothing built until then. In the interest of creating employment and self-employment opportunities for SC youth, he urged that MIDC should allot plots to organisations like DICCI on priority basis. Vinod Tawde ensured that the Koli brethren was given priority at the time when the municipal markets was being redeveloped. In their difficult times, Vinod tawde stood by the Konkan mango farmers. He urged that they should be compensated for crop loss; however the government did consider his proposal. Vinod Tawde exposed the fact that investigation in the case of murder of journalist J Dey was on a wrong track and Jigna Vora has been purposefully implicated in the case.

2013 
Vinod Tawde was the first leader to demand a separate budget for agriculture and he consistently proposed measures that the government should implement to enhance agriculture productivity and prevent farmer-suicides. In connection to the Adarsh housing society scam, Vinod Tawde demanded a special session of the state Legislature to table the action taken report (ATR); however the government took no action. He also demanded a SIT probe into wakf land allotments. With the help of a documentary evidence, Vinod Tawde exposed the fact that even after spending Rs. 70,000 crore, irrigated area in the state increased by only 1%. He used various legislative devices to compel the government to establish an enquiry committee under chairmanship of Madhavrao Chitale for investigation of corruption in irrigation sector. He presented a 15,000-pager documentary evidence before the Chitale Committee; the report of the committee held not only officers but also ministers guilty of corruption. Vinod Tawde condemned government's decision to start a textile park in Baramati; in his opinion the government should have selected a cotton producing district to set up the facility. He further pointed out that the textile policy announced by the government was non beneficial for farmers.

Academic qualification controversy 
Vinod Tawde obtained a Bachelor of Engineering Degree from Dnyaneshwar Vidyapeeth, Pune. However, Dnyaneshwar Vidyapeeth is not associated with the All India Council for Technical Education (AICTE) or the Directorate of Technical Education, Maharashtra. The Bombay High court had in a 2005 order, said that Dnyaneshwar Vidyapeeth does not have any rights to award degrees, and that the degrees issued even before 2005 were invalid.

Leader of Opposition in the Maharashtra Legislative Assembly, Radhakrishna Vikhe Patil, has demanded Tawde's resignation over his bogus degree. In defence of Tawde, Devendra Fadnavis, Chief Minister of Maharashtra said that Tawde never suppressed the fact and there was no need for him to resign.

References

External links

 
  Official profile on Bharatiya Janata Party - Maharashtra website

Bharatiya Janata Party politicians from Maharashtra
Living people
Politicians from Mumbai
Members of the Maharashtra Legislative Council
Leaders of the Opposition in the Maharashtra Legislative Council
1963 births
Maharashtra MLAs 2014–2019
State cabinet ministers of Maharashtra
Marathi politicians